Krylovka is the name of several rural localities (settlements, selos, and villages) in Russia:
Krylovka, Kaliningrad Oblast, a settlement in Divny Rural Okrug of Baltiysky District of Kaliningrad Oblast
Krylovka, Kursk Oblast, a settlement in Sovetsky Selsoviet of Sovetsky District of Kursk Oblast
Krylovka, Novosibirsk Oblast, a settlement in Karasuksky District of Novosibirsk Oblast
Krylovka, Orsk, Orenburg Oblast, a selo in Krylovsky Selsoviet of the city of Orsk,  Orenburg Oblast
Krylovka, Totsky District, Orenburg Oblast, a settlement in Zadorozhny Selsoviet of Totsky District of Orenburg Oblast
Krylovka, Penza Oblast, a selo in Mezhdurechensky Selsoviet of Kamensky District of Penza Oblast
Krylovka, Primorsky Krai, a selo in Kirovsky District of Primorsky Krai
Krylovka, Ryazan Oblast, a village in Adelinsky Rural Okrug of Shilovsky District of Ryazan Oblast
Krylovka, Samara Oblast, a settlement in Chelno-Vershinsky District of Samara Oblast
Krylovka, Bakcharsky District, Tomsk Oblast, a village in Bakcharsky District, Tomsk Oblast
Krylovka, Krivosheinsky District, Tomsk Oblast, a village in Krivosheinsky District, Tomsk Oblast
Krylovka, Voronezh Oblast, a selo in Timiryazevskoye Rural Settlement of Novousmansky District of Voronezh Oblast